Aloysius Joseph Willinger  (1886–1973) was an American member of the Congregation of the Most Holy Redeemer, commonly known as the Redemptorist Fathers, and a prelate of the Roman Catholic Church. He served as Bishop of Ponce from 1929 to 1946, and Bishop of Monterey-Fresno from 1953 to 1967.

Biography
Willinger was born in Baltimore, Maryland, on April 19, 1886, and entered the Redemptorist novitiate located in Ilchester, Maryland, in 1905, making his profession of religious vows as a member of the Congregation on August 2, 1906. He then studied theology at Mount St. Alphonsus Seminary in Esopus, New York, where he was ordained a priest of the Congregation of the Most Holy Redeemer on July 2, 1911.

On March 8, 1929, Willinger was appointed the second Bishop of Ponce in Puerto Rico by Pope Pius XI. He received his episcopal consecration on the following October 28 from Archbishop Thomas Edmund Molloy, the Bishop of Brooklyn, with Bishops John Mark Gannon and John Joseph Dunn serving as co-consecrators.

Willinger was named Coadjutor Bishop of Monterey-Fresno, California, and Titular Bishop of Bida on December 12, 1946, by Pope Pius XII. He later succeeded the late Philip George Scher as the eleventh Bishop of Monterey-Fresno upon the latter's death on January 3, 1953. He attended the Second Vatican Council from 1962 to 1965.

On October 16, 1967, Willinger retired as Bishop of Monterey-Fresno and was appointed Titular Bishop of Tiguala. He died on July 25, 1973, at age 87.

References

1886 births
1973 deaths
Religious leaders from Baltimore
Mount St. Alphonsus Seminary alumni
American Roman Catholic missionaries
Redemptorist bishops
Participants in the Second Vatican Council
Roman Catholic missionaries in Puerto Rico
20th-century Roman Catholic bishops in Puerto Rico
Roman Catholic bishops of Ponce